Gail Louw (born 13 October 1951) is a South African-born British playwright. She is known for the wide-ranging topics of her plays, though a central feature running through most of them is the focus on flawed characters in both ordinary and extraordinary circumstances. She is particularly well known for Blonde Poison which has had seven productions worldwide including at the Sydney Opera House.

Early life
Louw was born in Johannesburg to a middle class Jewish family. Her father, Maish Levy, was a second generation Jew from Lithuanian parents. Her mother, Ruth Levy (née Wallach) was born in Berlin in 1924. Ruth managed to get a student visa to Tel Aviv in April 1939. Her parents were deported to Minsk and were killed by the Nazis in 1942. Ruth and her sister Gila were told by the Red Cross at the end of the war that their parents had survived and were living in America. On the following day, they received a phone call to tell them that their parents had in fact been killed. Ruth lived in Israel until she met Maish who was volunteering at the time in the  1948 Arab–Israeli War. They returned to South Africa in 1948 for the birth of their son, Brian.

Louw left South Africa to live in Israel after finishing school at 17. She was one of the first students on the Mount Scopus campus in Jerusalem. She returned to Johannesburg to continue her studies in 1971. She studied at the University of the Witwatersrand for a degree in English and a teachers’ diploma. Louw moved to Brighton in the UK in 1976. After a variety of jobs, she received a PhD in Organisational Informatics in the NHS at Brighton University in 1994. After a training fellowship at the Institute of Child Health in Systematic Reviews, she began teaching at the University of Brighton and became the Progamme Leader in Public Health at the Institute of Postgraduate Medicine.

Career in theatre
Louw undertook a Postgraduate Diploma and later an MA in Dramatic Writing at Sussex University in 2000. With the support of New Writing South she was taken under the wing of Tony Milner from New Vic Productions who produced and directed many of her earlier plays.

Plays with Jewish themes
Her earliest plays all dealt with Jewish themes particularly related to her mother. Two Sisters, a semi-biographical retelling of the relationship of her mother and aunt, is set on a kibbutz in Israel. This play has had three productions; two different ones in the UK, one directed by Louw, and one in Los Angeles directed by Stewart Zully for Theatre 40. A fourth production, translated into the Hebrew and directed by Roy Horovitz is due to be produced in 2020 in Israel. Other early plays on a Jewish theme include Herschel, based on the story of Herschel Grynszpan who killed a top Nazi official in 1938 and precipitated Kristallnacht, Killing Faith, her first produced play, and Steps Out Of Time, originally called Shabat in Zfat. Her most performed play, Blonde Poison, is discussed below. A later play, Eishes Chayill – Woman of Valour, returns to the Jewish theme by using music to explore marriage, feminism and frustration in a Haredi community.
 
Although not a Jewish play, Joe Ho Ho is a four-hander which looks at sexual frustration, fantasy and the commitment a daughter feels for her mother. In this case the mother has Alzheimers; Louw used much of her experience caring for her own mother who suffered with Alzheimers in later life.

Political plays
Duwayne had a tagline – He survived Stephen Lawrence's killers: Can he survive the Met? This play won Best New Play at Brighton Festival in 2014. It portrays the experience Duwayne Brooks had at the hands of the Metropolitan Police. Actors were: Adrian DeCosta as Duwayne, David Aja and Andy De Marquez as various policemen.
The Ice Cream Boys is based on a fictionalised meeting between Jacob Zuma and Ronnie Kasrils. This play was put on at Jermyn Street Theatre in October 2019 and at Theatre on the Square in August 2020.  Actors were Jack Klaff as Kasrils, Andrew Francis as Zuma and Bu Kunene as the Nurse and others.

Monologues
Louw is particularly known for her monologues. All her monologues share a firmly held principle that the protagonist must be talking to someone, or several people, or people who change, or him/herself, but they are not talking to the audience. 
Three of her most far-reaching plays are monologues: Blonde Poison, Shackleton’s Carpenter, and "And This is My Friend Mr Laurel. The latter was commissioned by Jeffrey Holland who has performed the role in the UK and Ireland as well as on cruise ships for a number of years.Blonde Poison is Louw's best known and most accomplished play. It has had eight productions worldwide: a UK based one with Elizabeth Counsell as Stella Goldschlag; Salome Jens Theatre 40 in Beverly Hills Los Angeles; Carole Adams Fritsche at Verona Studio in Salem, Oregon; Belinda Giblin at the Sydney Opera House Sydney and at MTC Melbourne; Fiona Ramsay at Theatre on the Square in Johannesburg; Elizabeth Hawthorne in Auckland, New Zealand; Loureline Snedeker in Boca Raton, Florida; and Dulcie Smart in Berlin. Fiona Ramsay brought her production to London in June 2020. Several of the actors were nominated for prizes or won them.Shackleton’s Carpenter has been widely performed for many years by Malcolm Rennie. He has been nominated for an Offies award for best Male Performer in a play, after his three-week run at Jermyn Street Theatre in August 2019. He has toured the play several times throughout the UK and Ireland and has had over 100 performances including at Chichester Festival Theatre.Shackleton’s Carpenter had a dramatized reading with Peter FitzSimons at the Maritime Museum in Sydney for six nights.The Mitfords is a one-woman play where four of the Mitford sisters are represented; Jessica, Diana, Verity and Nancy. The play featured Heather Long in the role(s), and was sold out for its entire run. Larkin Descending is a one-man play about the poet Philip Larkin in his older days, talking to Monica. Graham White played Larkin and had a role in developing the play. Being Brahms won a Sussex and Surrey Radio award as best play of the year (Jeffrey Thompson). It featured Andrew Wheaton as Anton/Brahms and is based on a real story by Paul Humpolitz.The Good Dad (A Love Story) is based on a true story from the 1980s. It is an on- woman play with three roles; the actress plays the protagonist, her mother and her twin. The play is based on a young woman who was sexually abused by her father, but who ended up living and having several children with him. The lack of conflict and anger in the household contributed to a culture of silence and acceptance. In addition, he was seen as a good dad, who looked after all the members of both his families, providing love and care. His tricky heart resulted in the status quo continuing until he began to take an interest in the next generation. The production ran for 4 nights at The Old Red Lion in 2020, followed by a three-week run at The Hope Theatre in London.

Plays based on real peopleMiss Dietrich Regrets is based on the last months of Marlene Dietrich's life as she lay 24/7 in her bed in her Paris apartment. It is a two-hander with her and her daughter, Maria Riva, and explores the conflict between them. It is a revealing and poignant look at the aging Marlene battling with her daughter to retain her independence to the very end. There have been three productions of this play. The South African production won a Naledi Theatre Award for Fiona Ramsay as Best Actress. A Czech production Miss Dietrich Latuje has been extremely successful in Prague and has had repeated runs since 2017. The original production was with Elizabeth Counsell and Moira Brooker. The Ice Cream Boys and Duwayne, which are discussed above in Political Plays, are also based on well known people. Blonde Poison, And This is my friend Mr Laurel, The Mitfords, Larkin Descending and Shackleton’s Carpenter, discussed above under Monologues, are all based on real people, some well known.

Plays based on real eventsA Life Twice Given is based on the first part of the David Daniel's book of the same name. Part of the story relates to real events (the death of his child) and part to a fictional development (cloning the dead child). The three-hander included Natalia Campbell, Damian Reyes-Fox, and Johnny Neal. The Good Dad (A Love Story) is discussed above under Monologues and is based on a real event.

LGBT playsThe Half-Life of Love was produced in the UK with Jack Klaff, Paul Moriarty and Laurence Bown, and at the Verona Theatre in 2017 with Raissa Fleming, Pamela Bilderbeck and Barry Sexton. Junto Diaz said ‘The half-life of love is forever.’  It remains toxic, poisoning life long after love is over. The Numpty is a play about a family isolated and blown apart by poverty, lack of understanding and acceptance of crucial changes in gender identification. Tina, a lesbian transsexual, is forced to provide lodging to her ex-wife, a woman destroyed by poverty, poor education and prejudice, but feisty, funny and formidable. Their son however, refuses to let them attempt to make a life together. This play has not as yet had a production. My Beautiful Arse looks at the dangers that Cameroonian gay men have to endure. Set amongst a group of dancers, the play explores the culture of ‘witch’ and social adhesion that is used to reinforce acceptable sexual and behavioural norms. This play has not as yet had a production.

Plays
 Killing Faith (2008)
 Two Sisters (2010, 2016, 2017)
 Joe Ho Ho (2010)
 Blonde Poison (2011, 2014, 2015, 2016, 2017, 2018, 2019, 2019, 2020)
 Miss Dietrich Regrets (2015, 2015, 2017/18/19)
 Duwayne (2014)
 And This Is My Friend Mr Laurel (2012–2020)
 Shackleton’s Carpenter (2014, 2015, 2018, 2019)
 The Half-Life of Love (2016, 2017)
 The Mitfords (2017)
 Larkin Descending (2018)
 Being Brahms (2019)
 A Life Twice Given (2019)
 The Ice Cream Boys (2019, 2020)
 The Good Dad (A Love Story) 2020

Books
Oberon Books has published three collections with four plays in each book:
 Gail Louw: Collected Plays (2015)
 Blonde Poison, Miss Dietrich Regrets, Shackleton’s Carpenter, Two Sisters Gail Louw: Plays Two (2018)
 Duwayne, The Mitfords, The Half-Life of Love, Joe Ho Ho Gail Louw: Plays Three (2019)
 The Ice Cream Boys, Being Brahms, A Life Twice Given, Killing Faith Blonde Poison (2013) 
 The Ice Cream Boys'' (2019)

References

External links
 

Living people
1951 births
British women dramatists and playwrights
Musicians from Johannesburg
Jewish British musicians
People educated at Brighton College
South African emigrants to the United Kingdom
South African dramatists and playwrights
South African Jews
University of the Witwatersrand alumni